Dareton is a town in the far west of New South Wales, Australia. The town is located on the Silver City Highway, 1,025 kilometres west of the state capital, Sydney and 20 kilometres from the regional centre, Mildura, across the border in Victoria.

Located on the Murray River, the town is at the heart of the Coomealla Irrigation Area. Dareton was once home to an Aboriginal mission, which is now a residential area for Aboriginal people. Australian Test cricket captain Mark Taylor spent part of his early life in Dareton.

History

Dareton had its genesis in 1922 with the recommendation to establish irrigation in the area. Pioneering settlers moved to the district soon after, but it was not until after World War II and the establishment of soldier settler farms that Dareton began to prosper.  Dareton is named for the then Water Conservation and Irrigation Commissioner Henry Dare, who was a strong advocate for the irrigation scheme.

Today

Dareton today is a producer of grapes and dried fruit.  It boasts a championship golf course and is a popular location for fishing and camping.

A major local entity is the Coomealla Memorial Sporting Club. It operates a large gambling and social facility, plus various sporting facilities (including a golf course). The club was immensely popular with South Australians and Victorians looking for a pokies venue when they were unavailable in those states.

Schools include Dareton Public School, Coomealla High School and the Coomealla Campus of the Riverina Institute.

References

External links

Wentworth Shire Council - Official website
Visit Mildura - Dareton tourist site

Towns in New South Wales
Populated places on the Murray River
Australian soldier settlements
1922 establishments in Australia
Wentworth Shire